Luzzi is a town and comune in southern Italy.

Luzzi may also refer to:

 Luzzi (surname)